The Special One may refer to:

Broadcasting
"The Special One" (The Outer Limits), an episode of The Outer Limits television show
Gift Grub 6: The Special One, comedy sketches from Today FM's Gift Grub on Irish radio

Music
Special One, a 2003 rock album by Cheap Trick
The Special One (Yovie & Nuno album), a 2003 Indonesian pop album

Other
 Football manager José Mourinho - who was dubbed by the media in 2004 after saying "...I think I'm a special one".